Kevin James Slattery (18 September 1926 – 4 September 2004) was an Australian rules footballer who played with North Melbourne in the Victorian Football League (VFL).

Notes

External links 

1926 births
2004 deaths
Australian rules footballers from Victoria (Australia)
North Melbourne Football Club players